Mirrlees is a surname. Notable people with the surname include:

Hope Mirrlees (1887–1978), English translator, poet and novelist
James Mirrlees (born 1936), Scottish economist

See also
 MAN Diesel, current owner of the diesel engine manufacturer, Mirrlees, Bickerton & Day